Trianthema compactum is a species of flowering plant in the family Aizoaceae and is endemic to near-coastal areas of north-eastern Australia. It is a small herb with oblong to more or less round leaves and flowers arranged singly with five to seven stamens and a short, thick style.

Description
Flowering occurs from March to August.

Taxonomy
Trianthema compactum was first formally described in 1919 by Cyril Tenison White in the Botany Bulletin of the Queensland Department of Agriculture from specimens collected by John Frederick Bailey on Mornington Island.

Distribution and habitat
This plant grows on the shore around the Gulf of Carpentaria in the Northern Territory and Queensland.

References

compactum
Flora of the Northern Territory
Flora of Queensland
Plants described in 1919
Taxa named by Cyril Tenison White